is a Japanese manga artist, illustrator, and character designer. She made her professional manga debut in 1996 with the one-shot The Style of the Second Love in the shōjo manga magazine Ribon Original and later published her first series, I.O.N, in 1997, in the main Ribon magazine. She gained mainstream popularity from the late 1990s to mid-2000s with her series Phantom Thief Jeanne, Full Moon o Sagashite, and The Gentlemen's Alliance Cross.

Throughout her career, Tanemura's work has been recognized in shōjo manga for her art style and themes of young girls transforming into the women they would like to become. In addition to her publications, Tanemura has released two independent studio albums of songs based on her characters and is the character designer for Idolish7 and other media projects.

Early life
Arina Tanemura was born on March 12, 1978. Tanemura grew up in Aichi Prefecture. Her main source of entertainment was manga magazines because her local television stations only ran re-runs of older anime series, and she was unable to watch new shows. When she was in nursery school, her mother would often buy manga magazines aimed at an older female demographic, such as Bessatsu Margaret, Bessatsu Friend and Bessatsu Shōjo Comic. Her older brother, on the other hand, often read Weekly Shonen Jump. While in elementary school, Tanemura's friend lent her a copy of Ribon, and she became fascinated with its childish art style, later convincing her mother's co-worker to buy her a copy. Throughout elementary school, she also read Margaret regularly, and she began reading Shōjo Comic in junior high school.

Tanemura began drawing at the age of 5. She was heavily influenced by shōjo manga works from her childhood, and she mostly drew female characters. She started drawing manga beginning in spring break of her first year in high school, during which she stated she made her first submission to an amateur manga contest. At the same time, her female cousin had expressed interest in reading a story about a character Tanemura had drawn for her multiple times. Tanemura described her submission as a "dark" and "sad" story about the main character's boyfriend dying in a traffic accident and later being approached by his brother. Despite not winning, she later stated that she had passed the first round and earned  from the contest. Afterwards, she began practicing by drawing yonkoma.

Career

1996–1998: Debut and early fame

Tanemura debuted professionally at the age of 18 in 1996. Her debut work was a short comic titled The Style of the Second Love, which was published in the shōjo manga magazine Ribon Original. Despite being published in a sister magazine of the main Ribon, Tanemura stated that the story received positive feedback, and that she received 500 fan letters after it was serialized. The comic, along with her other short works, was later reprinted in the anthology Short-Tempered Melancholic. In 1997, Tanemura released I.O.N, her first series.

1998–2011: Mainstream popularity

From 1998 to 2000, Tanemura worked on Phantom Thief Jeanne. Phantom Thief Jeanne was successful, selling a cumulative total of 5,500,000 print copies. After Phantom Thief Jeanne ended, Tanemura followed up with Time Stranger Kyoko, but because the protagonist's "strong personality" failed to appeal to the editors and reader demographic, she was forced to end it after a year with 12 chapters. From 2002 to 2004, Tanemura worked on Full Moon o Sagashite, a story centered on an idol singer. Tanemura, having once wanted to become a lyricist, created the series out of a desire to write lyrics. Due to the negative feedback from Time Stranger Kyoko, this time, she gave the protagonist a subdued personality.

The popularity of Phantom Thief Jeanne and Full Moon o Sagashite led both works to receive television anime adaptations. Time Stranger Kyoko also received an anime adaptation and was screened as a short film at the 2001 Ribon Festival. For Full Moon o Sagashite, Tanemura also recorded a cover version of Changin' My Life's "Smile" titled "Smile (Arina's Vocal Version)", which was released on the soundtrack album Full Moon o Sagashite: Full Moon Final Live.

In 2004, Tanemura published The Gentlemen's Alliance Cross, which ran in Ribon until 2008. Unlike her previous series, The Gentlemen's Alliance Cross contained no fantasy elements. She provided the voice for Maora Ichinomiya and the Postman for the limited edition drama CD. Afterwards, she published Mistress Fortune, making her the first artist who ended and debuted a new series in the same issue of Ribon. Tanemura wrote Mistress Fortune as a "middle school romance" and intentionally made the story more light-hearted compared to The Gentlemen's Alliance Cross. Later in 2008, she launched Sakura Hime: The Legend of Princess Sakura.

From 2008 to 2009, Tanemura hosted her own online radio program, Tanemura Arina de Kyan: Manga Seminar, on Niconico Douga. To commemorate the 15th anniversary of her debut, Tanemura released an independent album titled Junai Tenshi on December 29, 2010 at Comic Market 79 under the circle name "Meguro Teikoku", with songs based on ten of her main female characters from her previous works. The album features vocals and lyrics from Tanemura, and she performed several songs live during her autograph event at Animate on March 6, 2011. While she had written lyrics to songs before, the CD project had come from her desire to write lyrics without having them altered by professional lyricists. After the 2011 Tōhoku earthquake and tsunami, Tanemura contributed to a dōjinshi anthology with other manga artists that was sold for charity efforts. From July to November 2011, she launched Fudanjuku Monogatari in Margaret, a manga adaptation featuring fictional portrayals of the idol girl group Fudanjuku. Tanemura had decided to draw the manga after they had expressed interest in cosplaying as her characters.

2011–present: Departure from Ribon, Idolish7

Beginning in May 2011, to celebrate Tanemura's 15th debut anniversary, Shueisha began reprinting I.O.N, Phantom Thief Jeanne, Time Stranger Kyoko, and Full Moon o Sagashite in bunkoban format. In November 2011, Tanemura ended her exclusive contract with Ribon to work freelance, her last work with the magazine being Sakura Hime: The Legend of Princess Sakura, which concluded in 2012. Following her announcement, Shueisha reprinted her short comics from 2001 to 2010 in the anthology Tanemura Arina: Ren'ai Monogatari-shū, which included a previously unpublished 6-page story.

Tanemura wrote and illustrated Neko to Watashi no Kinyōbi, which ran in Margaret from 2013 to 2015. At the same time, she also started serializing Idol Dreams in Hakusensha's Melody magazine. For the limited edition character song CD released with volume 3 of Idol Dreams, Tanemura wrote the lyrics to the song "Sakura-iro Time Trip." On March 23, 2013, Tanemura released her second album, Princess Tiara, on an independent record label, composed of theme songs performed by her based on her characters.

In 2015, Tanemura contributed character designs to the game and media project Idolish7. In addition, Tanemura provided illustrations to the novel and manga adaptations. She also contributed colored illustrations to the Touken Ranbu anthology, Touken Ranbu Gakuen. From 2015 to 2016, Tanemura briefly released dōjinshi as Meguro Teikoku. In October 2015, Tanemura collaborated with Yui Kikuta, one of her former assistants, to create the manga series Shunkan Lyle, which ran in Monthly Comic Zero Sum. From 2016 to 2017, she published the series Akuma ni Chic × Hack in Margaret. In 2019, to celebrate her 20th anniversary, Animate hosted a collaboration café from September 5 to September 24 featuring food based on characters from her original series published with Shueisha.

Artistry and themes

Tanemura she drew influences from shōjo manga from her childhood, particularly comedy stories such as Tokimeki Tonight and Chibi Maruko-chan, and she drew according to trends she believes were fashionable, resulting in her current art style. Tanemura stated that her art style is not derived from specific artists, and that she has been drawing in the same style since she was young, but has since then cited Hayao Miyazaki, Rumiko Takahashi, Kei Kusunoki, Yuu Watase, and Fumiko Tanikawa as people who have personally inspired her. In addition, Tanemura also cited Hideaki Anno as an influence, having watched his works during the second half of her "otaku phase". Tanemura intended to draw in a style that makes her works difficult to animate. While her earlier works had thicker and harsher lines, she described her artwork in 2017 as becoming more soft and flowy. Tanemura also primarily draws artwork without the use of digital tools and she illustrates using Dr. Ph. Martin coloring ink. The clothing featured in her works are inspired by clothing that she personally owns.

A common theme in Tanemura's shōjo manga works are female characters who transform back and forth between the young girls they are and the women they would like to become, and she drew Phantom Thief Jeanne, Full Moon o Sagashite and The Gentlemen's Alliance Cross specifically to exaggerate how girls want to become mature. Tanemura drew a reversal of this theme for Idol Dreams, where the main protagonist transforms into the young girl she had wanted to be, to appeal to fans who had grown up with her work.

The influence of idol singers is another theme present in Tanemura's works. Tanemura, a fan of Hello! Project groups such as Morning Musume and Berryz Kobo, had modeled the protagonist of Full Moon o Sagashite using then-Morning Musume member Ai Kago's corkscrew hairstyle. Idol Dreams is also centered on an idol singer, but Tanemura drew influences from older magical girl idol series like Creamy Mami and Fancy Lala. Tanemura stated that she is also a fan of Fudanjuku and actively follows their career; she is friends with the group's members and wrote the manga Fudanjuku Monogatari based on their stage personas.

Referring to Full Moon o Sagashite and The Gentlemen's Alliance Cross, Tanemura disclosed that her main female characters and their relationships are based on her friends or stories she has heard from them. She stated her stories were not meant to deliver a specific message to young women and that they were for everyone to enjoy. Her favorite of her works is The Gentlemen's Alliance Cross.

Publications

Series

Anthologies

Artbooks

Comic essays

Illustrations

Other works

Voice acting credits

Radio programs

Character design

Non-publication illustrations

Discography

Studio albums

Soundtrack appearances

References

External links 
 

1978 births
Living people
Women manga artists
Manga artists from Aichi Prefecture
Japanese female comics artists
Female comics writers
Japanese women writers